Høsterkøb Church is a parish church in the village of Høsterkøb, Rudersdal Municipality, some 20 km north of central Copenhagen, Denmark.

History
The church was designed by Ulrik Plesner. Construction began in 1907 and it was inaugurated on 5 June 1907.

Architecture

The church is built of small red bricks with white plaster ornamentation. The tower is placed on the south side of the nave. Some of the decorations were designed by Thorvald Bindesbøll.

Interior and furnishings
The altarpiece is from 1599 and is originally from Birkerød Church.
The upper part of the font is made of granite and is originally from Lynge Church; the base dates from 1907. The pulpit is built of brick and is located in the southeastern corner of the church. It is decorated with plastered leaf ornamentation. The organ is from 1972 and was built by Th. Frobenius & Sønner in Kongens Lyngby.

Churchyard
The churchyard was not inaugurated until 1933. It is a woodland cemetery and fencing the individual graves is not permitted. Notable burials include:
 Finn Birger Christensen (1927–2004), 
 Karl-Otto Hedal (1921–2006), painter
 Gerda Janson (1920–2008), politician and resistance fighter
 Ea Koch (1905–1987), weaver
 Mogens Koch (1898–1992), architect and designer
  (1902-1992), historian and resistance fighter 
 Torben Valeur (1920–2001), architect

References

External links

 Official website
 Danmarkskirker.natmus.dk Høsterkøb Kirke

Churches in Rudersdal Municipality
Churches in the Diocese of Helsingør